Henry Shattuck Richardson (born 1955) is an American philosopher, author,  Professor of Philosophy at Georgetown University, and Senior Research Scholar at the Kennedy Institute of Ethics.

Early life and education 
Henry Shattuck Richardson is the son of Anne Richardson, who was once the chair of Reading is Fundamental, and the politician and lawyer Elliot Richardson, who served as United States Secretary of Defense, Attorney General, and Secretary of Commerce.

Richardson graduated magna cum laude from Harvard University with a Bachelor of Arts degree in 1977. He then received a J.D. from Harvard Law School and an M.P.P. from the John F. Kennedy School of Government (supervised by Martha Nussbaum), both in 1981. In 1986, Richardson received his Ph.D. in Philosophy from Harvard University under the supervision of John Rawls; his thesis was titled Rational deliberation of ends.

Academic career
Richardson's main work has centred on practical reasoning. His first book, Practical Reasoning about Final Ends, focused on individual reasoning, whilst his second book, Democratic Autonomy: Public Reasoning about the Ends of Policy, which won the Herbert A. Simon Best Book Award in Public Administration,  and the David Easton Award in the Foundations of Political Theory,  dealt with collective reasoning.

In addition to working on practical reasoning and moral and political philosophy, Richardson has written on bioethics. He has twice been a visiting scholar at the Department of Bioethics at the (U.S.) National Institutes of Health.

From 2008 to 2018, he was the Editor of the academic journal Ethics.  From 2010 to 2013, through his work as a member of the World Commission on the Ethics of Scientific Knowledge and Technology (COMEST), he has acted as an advisor to the Director General of UNESCO on ethical issues relating to science and technology.

In September 2014 Richardson began a two-year tenure as president of the Human Development and Capability Association (HDCA). He was succeeded by the economist Ravi Kanbur.  From 2014 to 2017, he served as one of two "coordinating lead authors" on the orienting normative chapter of the three-volume report of the International Panel of Social Progress, Rethinking Society for the 21st Century.

In 2019, Richardson was awarded a Guggenheim Fellowship.

Works

Books

Journal articles

References

External links
 
 Profile: Henry S Richardson Kennedy Institute of Ethics
 Profile: Henry S Richardson Georgetown University

1955 births
20th-century American philosophers
21st-century American philosophers
American ethicists
American people of Dutch descent
Bioethicists
Georgetown University faculty
Living people
Livingston family
Schuyler family
Date of birth missing (living people)
Harvard Law School alumni
Place of birth missing (living people)
Harvard Kennedy School alumni
Philosophy journal editors
Harvard College alumni